The Fade in Time is the second studio album by English musician Sam Lee. It was released in March 2015 under The Next Collective. In 2016, the album won the Songlines Music Awards in the category Europe.

Track listing

References

2015 albums
Sam Lee (folk musician) albums